The following is a list of flying aces from Iran.

Flying aces

Iran–Iraq war (1980–1988) 

 Fazlollah Javidnia, 12 or 11 (+2 probable) victories
 Jalil Zandi, 11 or 9 (+3 probable) victories
 Fereidoun Ali-Mazandarani, 9 or 11 victories
 Abolfazl Mehreganfar, 6 victories
 Hassan Harandi, 6 victories
 Shahram Rostami, 5 or 6 victories
 Jamshid Afshar, 5 or 6 victories
 Hossein Khalili, 5 victories
 Jalil Moslemi, 5 victories
 K. Sedghi, 5 victories
 Mostafa Roustaei, 5 victories
 Khalil Dashtizadeh, 5 victories
 Assadollah Adeli, 5 victories

Other 
 Mohammad Taqi Pessian who flown several combat missions for the Imperial German Air Service during World War I, reputedly shoot down up to 25 aircraft in aerial dogfights along the western front.

References

Citations

Sources 
 
 
 
 

Iran
 
flying aces